Francesco Recine (born 7 February 1999) is an Italian volleyball player who won 2021 European Championship.

Honours

Clubs
 2022/2024  Italian Cup, with Gas Sales Bluenergy Piacenza

References

External links
 

1999 births
Living people
Italian men's volleyball players
Sportspeople from Ravenna